Björn Jacob (born 3 December 1974) is a German former professional tennis player.

Jacob, a French Open junior quarter-finalist, competed on the professional tour in the 1990s and had a career high singles ranking of 416 in the world. He featured in qualifying draws for the Australian Open and US Open. His only ATP Challenger title came in doubles, at Nettingsdorf in 1997. He is a former personal coach of Julia Görges.

ATP Challenger titles

Doubles: (1)

References

External links
 
 

1974 births
Living people
German male tennis players
German tennis coaches